The New York Ukulele Ensemble was founded by playwright and novelist Uke Jackson. Members included: Heather Lev, Katie Down, Debra Sherline, Holly Duthie, Christina Liao, J Walter Hawkes, Greg Gattuso, Uncle Zac, and Uke Jackson. The line up is all ukulele, including soprano, concert, tenor, baritone and bass ukuleles, and banjo ukes.

The group's first CD, Ukulele Street, which included performances by additional ukulele players, was released in 2007.

Appearances by the New York Ukulele Ensemble included New York City's Art Parade and the thirty-first annual Village Halloween Costume Ball at the Theater for the New City in 2007, and the Gershwin Hotel's Living Room Series and the New York Ukulele Fest, which was founded by Uke Jackson, in 2006. The group went on a hiatus in 2008 and in 2009 Uke Jackson sold the New York Ukulele Fest to a promoter.

The New York Ukulele Ensemble performed original songs and tunes drawn from a variety of music genres. Their music is meant to present audiences with entertainment that frequently challenges cultural suppositions.

External links 
 https://query.nytimes.com/gst/fullpage.html?res=9401E7D8143BF93BA15750C0A96E9C8B63 New York Times article on Uke Jackson (Stephen DiLauro) and the NY Uke Fest.
Time Out New York article on The New York Ukulele Ensemble
The New York Ukulele Ensemble's video on behalf of the Willie Nelson Peace Research Institute

Ukulele players
Music organizations based in the United States